Caravonica is a comune (municipality) in the Province of Imperia in the Italian region Liguria, located about  southwest of Genoa and about  northwest of Imperia.

Caravonica borders the following municipalities: Borgomaro, Cesio, Chiusanico, and Pieve di Teco.

References

Cities and towns in Liguria